Pluto (stylized in all caps) is a Japanese manga series written and illustrated by Naoki Urasawa. It was serialized in Shogakukan's seinen manga magazine Big Comic Original from September 2003 to April 2009, with its chapters collected into eight tankōbon volumes. The series is based on Osamu Tezuka's Astro Boy, specifically  story arc, and named after the arc's chief villain. Urasawa reinterprets the story as a suspenseful murder mystery starring Gesicht, a Europol robot detective trying to solve the case of a string of robot and human deaths. Takashi Nagasaki is credited as the series' co-author. Macoto Tezka, Osamu Tezuka's son, supervised the series, and Tezuka Productions is listed as having given cooperation.

The series was licensed and released in English in North America by Viz Media under the name Pluto: Urasawa x Tezuka. An original net anime series, produced by Genco and Tezuka Productions, and animated by Studio M2, is set to premiere on Netflix in 2023.

Pluto was a critical and commercial success, winning several awards, including the ninth Tezuka Osamu Cultural Prize, and selling over 8.5 million copies.

Plot
Pluto follows the Europol robot detective Gesicht in his attempts to solve the case of a string of robot and human deaths around the world where all the victims have objects shoved into or positioned by their heads, imitating horns. The case becomes more puzzling when evidence suggests a robot is responsible for the murders, which would make it the first time a robot has killed a human in eight years. All seven of the great robots of the world, the most scientifically advanced which have the potential to become weapons of mass destruction, seem to be the killer's targets, and the murdered humans are connected to preserving the International Robot Laws which grant robots equal rights.

Characters

A German robot inspector working for Europol. His body is made out of an alloy called "zeronium", and he is capable of firing a devastating blast using the alloy as shell. He and his wife, Helena, both have a human appearance.

A Swiss mountain guide robot that is killed at the beginning of the story. He fought in the 39th Central Asian War. Loved by humans, many mourned for him.

A Scottish robot with six mechanical armed arms, formerly one of the most powerful fighting robots during the 39th Central Asian War. He prefers not to fight, choosing instead to work as the butler of a blind renowned composer.

A Turkish robot pankration wrestler with a great devotion to his robot wife and his five human children. He fought alongside Mont Blanc and Hercules in the 39th Central Asian War.

A Greek robot pankration wrestler with a high sense of honor and bravery. He and Brando have been rivals and friends since the 39th Central Asian War.

An Australian photon-powered gentle and sensitive robot with a pacifist outlook. He runs an orphanage to take care of war orphans. Epsilon chose not to fight during the 39th Central Asian War.

A Japanese boy robot who was formerly the peace ambassador toward the end of the 39th Central Asian War. His artificial intelligence and sensors are more advanced than the other seven great robots of the world.

Atom's robot younger sister who can sense human, animal, and robot emotions.

The robot that killed a human eight years prior to the story. He is imprisoned in an artificial intelligence correctional facility, where Gesicht visits him to get an idea of the killer he is trying to track down.

A genius robotics scientist and former head of Japan's Ministry of Science. He created Atom and is the authority on artificial intelligence.

A Japanese robotics scientist and current head of Japan's Ministry of Science. He is the creator of Uran and also looks after Atom. He was a member of the Bora Survey Group, a UN-dispatched group of inspectors sent to Persia to look for robots of mass destruction.

The creator of zeronium and Gesicht.

The head of the Persian Ministry of Science, he lost most of his body, and his family, in the 39th Central Asian War, with most of his body now being robotic replacements.

A powerful sentient supercomputer, belonging to the United States of Thracia, whose only avatar to the outside world is a teddy bear.

A German trader who is a member of the anti-robot group, KR, and suspects that Gesicht killed his brother.

An extremely powerful robot created by Dr. Abullah.

Production
Naoki Urasawa and Takashi Nagasaki began Pluto after over a year of negotiating to get the rights to adapt Osamu Tezuka's Astro Boy. With Astro/Atom's official birth date of April 7, 2003 approaching, Urasawa was initially going to do a limited or one-off manga in celebration. But due to the character's importance, he suggested a long-term "serious" take on "The Greatest Robot on Earth" arc, which is his favorite. After re-reading it, he felt that some scenes were missing or different than he remembered, before realizing that he had created his own version of the story in his head. Initially, Urasawa had pitched the idea as if someone else would create it. After many people, including Nagasaki, told him he should be the one to do it, Urasawa said the idea that resulted from story discussions seemed "too good to let anybody else do."

Urasawa, Nagasaki, and an editor from Shogakukan approached Tezuka Productions with the idea. Tezuka's son Macoto Tezka was informed of the idea in winter 2002. But with a new anime adaptation and other events already in the works, he did not want it to feel as if they were capitalizing on the special occasion. He felt there would be plenty of opportunity to have other artists do it at a later date and politely turned Urasawa down. However, Urasawa persisted and asked for a meeting where he would show rough sketches and explain what kind of story he wanted to create. Macoto met with Urasawa, Nagasaki and others on March 28, 2003. Macoto made Urasawa promise not to imitate his father but make the story in his own style, and even asked him to rethink the character designs.

Fusanosuke Natsume pointed out that in Pluto Urasawa included references not only to other Astro Boy arcs, but to other works by Tezuka as well, such as the characters Tawashi and Nakamura; the police car designed to look like a dog; Uran's encounter with animals; and an obsolete robot maid. He suspects the last is a reference to the "Future" volume of Phoenix.

Although people often call Pluto a dark take on a children's classic, Urasawa feels that the idea that Tezuka's work is lighthearted is a common misconception. He described "The Greatest Robot on Earth" arc as not being "about a righteous robot that took down bad robots, it was about the emptiness of war. When I read that when I was about 4, I felt like I had been told a very deep story, something meant for adults. I think everyone felt that way when they read it. It was never actually meant for kids." He additionally explained that through its anime and various adaptations it has been "reimagined as very wholesome and safe content, but if you really look at Tezuka's work on a deeper level, it's very dark. If you aim to properly adapt or remake any of Tezuka's work, you will naturally end up with a very dark story."

When asked in 2019 what advice he would give to an artist who wanted to adapt one of his own works like he did Astro Boy, Urasawa replied "Don't do it!" He explained that even though he understood the responsibility of the undertaking, the pressure and intense struggle was so much that he will never do it again and would advise a young artist to avoid it as well. Similarly, Nagasaki has also said he will not do it again.

Media

Manga
Written and illustrated by Naoki Urasawa, while also writing 20th Century Boys, Pluto was serialized in Shogakukan's seinen manga magazine Big Comic Original from September 5, 2003, to April 4, 2009. The chapters were collected and published into eight tankōbon volumes, each of which had a deluxe edition that includes the color pages from the chapters' original magazine run released before the normal version; the first volume was published on September 30, 2004, and the last on June 19, 2009. Takashi Nagasaki, who would later go on to work with Urasawa on Billy Bat and Master Keaton Remaster, is credited as the series' co-author. Macoto Tezka, Osamu Tezuka's son, supervised the series and Tezuka Productions is listed as having given cooperation.

It was licensed and released in English in North America by Viz Media, under the name Pluto: Urasawa x Tezuka.

Volume list

Film
Universal Pictures and Illumination acquired the rights to Pluto in 2010 for a live-action/CGI film. No news has emerged since.

Stage play
A play adaptation of Pluto that incorporated 3D imagery via projection mapping opened at Tokyo's Bunkamura Theatre Cocoon on January 9, 2015. Directed and choreographed by Sidi Larbi Cherkaoui, it starred Mirai Moriyama as Atom, Yasufumi Terawaki as Gesicht, Hiromi Nagasaku as both Uran and Helena, Akira Emoto as both Professor Tenma and Blau 1589, Kazutoyo Yoshimi as both Professor Ochanomizu and Dr. Roosevelt, and Yutaka Matsushige as Abullah. A new production of the play was performed in Tokyo, England, the Netherlands, Belgium and Osaka between January 6 and March 14, 2018. New cast members included Tao Tsuchiya as both Uran and Helena, Shunsuke Daitō as Gesicht, and Mitsuru Fukikoshi as Abullah. A performance of the play was broadcast on WOWOW Prime on June 23, 2018.

Anime
An anime adaptation by Studio M2 was announced to be in production at the 2017 Annecy International Animated Film Festival in June. In May 2022, the adaptation was confirmed to still be in production by Studio M2 founder Masao Maruyama. In February 2023, it was announced that the series will stream exclusively on Netflix in 2023. Genco and Tezuka Productions, with animation services by Studio M2, is producing the anime.

Reception
Pluto has sold over 8.5 million volumes and has won and been nominated for numerous awards. It was awarded the ninth Tezuka Osamu Cultural Prize and an Excellence Prize at the seventh Japan Media Arts Festival, both in 2005. Marking Urasawa's second and third time receiving those honors respectively. Also in 2005, Pluto topped the first Kono Manga ga Sugoi! list for male readers, which surveyed people in the manga and publishing industry. In 2010, the series was given the 41st Seiun Award for Best Comic and won Best Series at Italy's Lucca Comics Awards. In France, the manga won the 2010 Prix Asie-ACBD award at Japan Expo and the 2011 Intergenerational Award at the Angoulême International Comics Festival.

The American Young Adult Library Services Association named Pluto of their Top Ten Graphic Novels for Teens of 2009, likewise, the School Library Journal nominated the series as one of the Best Comics for Teens. At the 2010 Eisner Awards, Viz's English edition was nominated for Best Limited Series or Story Arc and Best U.S. Edition of International Material—Asia, additionally, Urasawa was nominated for the Best Writer/Artist award for both Pluto and 20th Century Boys. Viz's edition was also nominated for the Harvey Award in the Best American Edition of Foreign Material category.

Joseph Luster of Otaku USA called Pluto "flat-out incredible" and felt it should be required reading, "not just for fans of comics, but for fans of solid, absorbing stories." He said that, as a reimagining of another work, it "goes above and beyond the call of duty, and there aren't many other series out there that can get me clamoring for the next set of chapters like this one does." In her review, Deb Aoki of About.com claimed Pluto "will suck you in with its masterful storytelling, and will break your heart with its uncommon emotional depth." and gave the first volume a five out of five rating. She also stated that the series conjures up "thought-provoking questions about robots and what it means to be human." Manga critic Jason Thompson pointed out the series' obvious allusions to the real-life Iraq War; the United States of Thracia (United States of America) invaded Persia (Iraq) after falsely claiming they had robots of mass destruction (weapons of mass destruction). Reviewing volume seven, Anime News Network'''s Carlo Santos felt the story got a lot more enjoyable with all the loose ends tied up and said Urasawa does a fine job of integrating Tezuka's design with his own style. However, he wrote that "Urasawa continues to add pointless little flourishes to the story: references to Pinocchio, a creepy little children's song, a symbolic crack in a wall. It probably all has some kind of thematic unity in his head". Santos strongly praised the final volume, saying it works on every level; with philosophical points of war and humanity and artificial intelligence, and feelings of love, hate, hope, and despair that tug at the heart.The Guardian theater critic Michael Billington called the set and visuals of the stage adaptation of Pluto'' "spectacular" and gave the 2018 London performance 3 out of 5 stars. He finished by writing "The show may appeal to manga devotees and is clearly on the side of good in its plea for a world free from hate. But, for all its technical skill, it never engages us emotionally and never explains how we create a world in which humans and robots usefully coexist. This is comic-book theatre executed with great panache but to little real purpose."

Notes

References

External links
 Pluto at Viz Media
 
 

2003 manga
2023 anime ONAs
Astro Boy
Genco
Japanese-language Netflix original programming
Mystery anime and manga
Naoki Urasawa
Netflix original anime
Robot comics
Science fiction anime and manga
Seinen manga
Shogakukan manga
Thriller anime and manga
Upcoming Netflix original programming
Viz Media manga
Winner of Tezuka Osamu Cultural Prize (Grand Prize)